The Désirade skink (Mabuya desiradae) is a species of skink found in Guadeloupe.

References

Mabuya
Reptiles described in 2012
Endemic fauna of Guadeloupe
Reptiles of Guadeloupe
Taxa named by Stephen Blair Hedges
Taxa named by Caitlin E. Conn